Susie Q is a 1996 fantasy-comedy television film directed by John Blizek and starring Justin Whalin, Amy Jo Johnson and Shelley Long. It originally aired on Super RTL in Germany, followed by Disney Channel airing it in the United States on October 3, 1996. The film tells the story of a teenager dying with her boyfriend (Bentley Mitchum) on her way to their Winter Formal back in the mid-1950s and coming back to her old house 40 years later in order to help her parents avoid being kicked out of their trailer park home. Later, Zach (Whalin) moves into Susie's (Johnson) old house, but he is the only one who is able to see Susie.

The film was given a "TV-G" rating, and was already cut for some profanity, but not all, when it primarily aired on the Disney Channel.

Plot
In the fictional town of Willow Valley, Washington during the year 1955, teenager Susie Quinn prepares for her Winter Formal. She and her boyfriend, Johnny Angel, are oblivious to the fact that an inebriated motorist would soon force their car into a waterway where they subsequently drown. Forty years later, a teenager named Zach Sands moves into that very house with his widowed mother Penny who has a new job as a news reporter. Zach's father had died in a car accident on his way to Zach's basketball game — and Zach feels so guilty he abandons basketball. Now a student at the local high school, Zach befriends the drama group but also makes enemies of the envious Ray Kovich whose father, Roger, is a banker.

While fishing with his younger sister Teri, Zach finds a bracelet that causes Susie's ghost to manifest before Zach. Eventually, Zach researches Susie and discovers that she died 40 years ago. That night, Susie visits Zach again, and proves to him that he is the only one who can see her. Later Susie arrives at Zach's school, where he's distracted by the other girls in school - until Susie rips off part of the winter formal dress she's wearing to get his attention. Susie begs Zach to help her find out what happened to her parents but, while doing so, causes a scene in Zach's class. She apologizes, but continues to cause trouble at school and home until Zach agrees to help.

While visiting Susie's parents, Zach finds out they are facing homelessness at the hands of the local bank because of a missing title deed, and that the bank is demanding an unaffordable $25,000 balloon payment. However, this is only one part of a larger plan, led by Roger, that would eventually destroy the town. Heading back home, Susie confesses that before she died, her grandfather was looking for the deed for Willow Valley. She reveals to Zach that she is still earth-bound because of a mistake she had made in persuading her grandfather to rest, rather than help him find the deed that could have secured her family. Only then, Zach realizes how much Susie needs his help to find the deed and secure her family's legacy. Teri discovers that much of the town's land legally belongs to the Quinn family, and it becomes a fierce race to the finish as Zach locates the requisite title deed. It draws the attention of the police; meanwhile Roger is warned and makes his own plans. After the police arrest Zach and Teri, Susie manages to save them by scaring the officer into letting them go free.

Finally, Zach and Teri make it to the local news station just in time to provide their mother with all of the information about the Quinn family's history, which is broadcast on live television. In the aftermath, the bankers give up and apologize to the Quinns, the Kovich family leave town in an attempt on Roger's part to avoid criminal prosecution and Zach returns to playing basketball in honor of his late father. Thanks to Susie providing Zach with her father's old playbook, the team wins. With her mistake rectified, Susie returns to the bridge where she died. Zach follows her there and asks her what will happen to him now that she's leaving for heaven. Susie tells him that his life is just beginning and she is sure he can continue playing basketball for both her and his late father. Susie reunites with the spirits of her boyfriend, Johnny and her grandfather in Johnny's car. Before the ghostly trio depart for heaven, Susie gives Zach her bracelet and bidding him an emotional farewell, vice versa Zach admits he loves her. In the car, her grandfather briefly awakens and calls Susie by her mother's name, Betsy. She corrects him by telling him that her name is Susie and tells him to go back to sleep because they have a long trip ahead. In the closing scene, Zach meets a girl who looks identical to Susie and introduces herself as Maggie. It is presumed that Susie got reincarnated as Maggie.

Cast

 Amy Jo Johnson as Susie Q / Maggie
 Ernie Prentice as Grandfather
 Bentley Mitchum as Johnny Angel
 Tasha Simms as Betsy Quinn
 Allan Morgan as Russell Quinn
 Shelley Long as Penny Sands
 Justin Whalin as Zach Sands
 Andrea Libman as Teri Sands
 Garwin Sanford as Coach Stanford
 Chris William Martin as Ray Kovich
 Dale Wilson as Roger Kovich
 Winston Brown as Brad
 Sabrina Byrne as Rebecca Bahner
 Mark Schooley as Telephone Repairman
 Lloyd Berry as Al the Janitor
 Benjamin Ratner as TV Director
 Laura Harris as Jannete
 Kirsten Robek as Production Assistant
 Pat Waldron as Miss Crosby 
 David Kaye as Don Tanner
 Walter Marsh as Old Man - ATM
 Will Sasso as Officer Bob
 Allan Franz as Rookie Cop
 John Johnston as Announcer
 Carolyn Spielmacher as Girl
 Brian Arnold as James McGlockton
 Rebecca Toolan as Mrs. Perkins
 Aaron Pearl as Player
 Cameron Labine as Thug

See also
Teenage tragedy songs of the 50s and early 60s
List of ghost films

Footnotes

External links
 
 

1996 television films
1996 films
1990s fantasy comedy films
1990s ghost films
1996 romantic comedy films
1990s romantic fantasy films
1990s teen comedy films
1990s teen fantasy films
1990s teen romance films
American fantasy comedy films
American ghost films
American romantic comedy films
American romantic fantasy films
American teen comedy films
American teen romance films
Disney Channel original films
Films set in 1955
Films set in 1995
Films set in Washington (state)
Films shot in Vancouver
Films with screenplays by Shuki Levy
Films scored by Shuki Levy
1990s English-language films
1990s American films